Sumuru, or Sax Rohmer's Sumuru, is a 2003 pulp science fiction film directed by Darrell Roodt and starring Alexandra Kamp and Michael Shanks. It is an update of the character Sumuru created by pulp novelist Sax Rohmer. It was the first adaptation of Sumuru in a sci-fi setting (the prior two adaptions were The Million Eyes of Sumuru (1967) and The Girl from Rio (1969)).

Story
Earth's outermost colony was forgotten for 900 years -- until now. Cut off from the rest of the universe, men have become beasts of labor -- and women rule.

Arriving on the planet Antares, Adam Wade and Jake Carpenter come with a mission and a secret. Humanity has suffered from a deadly virus that has left the women barren, and the two are to seek out the last fertile members of the human race and relocate them. 

When the small spaceship crashes, the two find the planet run by women ruled by Queen Sumuru, and the men slaving in primitive mines, used occasionally for procreation purposes. 

The two astronauts have to overcome anti-male prejudice as well as earthquakes, a giant snake (The Snake Mother, worshipped as a Goddess by the High Priestess Taxan and her followers) and opposition from snake cult priestess Taxan, but find support in the relatively rational-minded queen Sumuru as well as her personal guard Dove and her kid brother Will.

Ultimately Taxan and her followers are defeated and Adam, Jake, Sumuru and her followers including the freed male slaves set off for an anticipated new home amongst the stars; escaping Antarres, which is due to explode from its internal pressures.

Cast
 Alexandra Kamp - Sumuru
 Michael Shanks - Adam Wade
 Simona Levin - Taxan
 Terence Bridgett - Jake Carpenter
 David Lazarus - Will
 Casey B. Dolan - Dove

Production 
The film was produced in late 2002 in the area around Johannesburg and Pretoria, mainly around and in mine dumps, the Voortrekker Monument, a film studio in Johannesburg and a disused explosives factory in Modderfontein.

Reception 
The film received relatively bad reviews, being called "thoroughly forgettable"; other reviews refer to the rules of the genre ("trash factor") and call it "good fun".

References

External links

2003 films
British science fiction films
German science fiction films
English-language German films
English-language South African films
2000s English-language films
Films directed by Darrell Roodt
2003 science fiction films
South African science fiction films
2000s British films
2000s German films